Clypeosphaerulina is a fungal genus in the class Sordariomycetes. The relationship of this taxon to other taxa within the class is unknown (incertae sedis). A monotypic genus, it contains the single species Clypeosphaerulina vincae.

References

Monotypic Ascomycota genera
Sordariomycetes enigmatic taxa